Sergey Vladimirovich Li (born 5 August 1962) is a retired Soviet weightlifter of Korean origin. He won silver medals at the world championships in 1987 and 1990 and at the European championships in 1988.

Li took up weightlifting at the age of 12 and was trained by his father, who won the Soviet title in 1975 and trained the Kyrgyz weightlifting team.

References

1962 births
Living people
Sportspeople from Bishkek
Soviet people of Korean descent
Kyrgyzstani people of Korean descent
Soviet male weightlifters
Kyrgyzstani male weightlifters
World Weightlifting Championships medalists
Honoured Masters of Sport of the USSR
European Weightlifting Championships medalists